Stephan Simpson (born 3 December 1963) is a South African former professional wrestler, better known by the ring name Steve Simpson.

Professional wrestling career 
Simpson is the son of wrestler Sammy Cohen. Sammy Cohen was the stage name for father Alec Simpson. Steve started wrestling in 1984 and achieved his first amount of stardom in the National Wrestling Alliance's Pacific Northwest territory. He was half of the S&S Express with Joe Savoldi and they captured the Tag Team Titles there. Steve Simpson also worked for the World Wrestling Council in Puerto Rico.

In 1986, Steve went to World Class Championship Wrestling where he became an ally of the Von Erich family in their war with the Fabulous Freebirds. He was joined by his brother, Shaun Simpson, in 1987 and they formed a tag team that won the Tag Team titles. Their biggest feud was against John Tatum and Jack Victory. They also had a brother Stuart who briefly wrestled in WCCW with them.

They left WCCW in late 1989 to wrestle in South Africa but Steve returned in 1991 to wrestle in the newly formed Global Wrestling Federation in Texas. His manager at the time was Percy Pringle III. He formed a tag team with Chris Walker and they became the first champions after winning a tournament over Rip Rogers and Scott Anthony, who were members of the heel stable The Cartel. In early 1992, Simpson went back to wrestle in South Africa and retired in 1998.

Championships and accomplishments 
Global Wrestling Federation
GWF Tag Team Championship (1 time) - with Chris Walker
GWF Tag Team Championship Tournament (1991) - with Chris Walker
Interworld Wrestling Promotions
World Mid-Heavyweight Title (1 time)
Pacific Northwest Wrestling
NWA Pacific Northwest Tag Team Championship (1 time) - with Joe Savoldi
World Class Wrestling Association
WCWA Television Championship (1 time)
WCWA Texas Tag Team Championship (3 times) - with Shaun Simpson
WCWA World Six-Man Tag Team Championship (1 time) - with Chris Adams and Kevin Von Erich
WCWA World Tag Team Championship (1 time) - with Shaun Simpson

References

External links 
 

1963 births
20th-century professional wrestlers
Living people
South African male professional wrestlers
Sportspeople from Johannesburg
GWF Tag Team Champions